Álvaro Arbeloa Coca (born 17 January 1983) is a Spanish retired footballer, currently manager of Real Madrid Juvenil A. He predominantly played as a right-back, and occasionally on the left side.

He started his professional career with Real Madrid, playing mostly with the reserves. In 2006 he moved to Deportivo, joining Liverpool after half a season and going on to appear in 98 official matches over three Premier League seasons. In 2009, he returned to Real Madrid for a fee of £5 million, spending seven years there and winning eight major titles, including the 2011–12 edition of La Liga and two Champions League titles.

Arbeloa earned 56 caps for Spain, representing the country at the 2010 World Cup, Euro 2008 and Euro 2012 and winning all three tournaments.

Club career

Real Madrid
Arbeloa was born in Salamanca, Castile and León, relocating with his family to Zaragoza at the age of four. He started playing football at local Real Zaragoza, joining Real Madrid's youth system at the age of 18.

Arbeloa spent three full seasons with Real Madrid Castilla, the reserve team, two of those spent in the Segunda División B. In 2004–05, he contributed 32 games and one goal – playoffs included – as they returned to Segunda División after a 14-year absence. On 16 October 2004, he made his La Liga debut with the main squad, coming on as a second-half substitute in a 1–1 away draw against Real Betis.

Deportivo
On 24 July 2006, Arbeloa signed for Deportivo de La Coruña, with Real Madrid being entitled to 50% of any transfer occurring in the following three years. He said of his departure: "This is a strange situation for me; I have been playing for Real Madrid for five years, since I was 16", adding "Real always has the best players. There were eight defenders in the squad, something had to give in."

Over a six-month spell with the team from Galicia, Arbeloa featured in 21 official games, 18 of his league appearances being complete.

Liverpool

Arbeloa signed for English club Liverpool on 31 January 2007, managed by countryman Rafael Benítez. He made his Premier League debut on 10 February, replacing Jermaine Pennant for the final 15 minutes of the 2–1 away loss to Newcastle United.

Arbeloa made his first start for the Reds against FC Barcelona, in the 2006–07 edition of the UEFA Champions League. He featured as a left-back at the Camp Nou, as his stronger right foot could stop Lionel Messi who had a tendency to cut his runs towards the center of the field; his team won 2–1 and eventually 2–2 on aggregate, with the player also featuring the full 90 minutes at Anfield.

Arbeloa scored his first goal for Liverpool against Reading, on 7 April 2007. He replaced Steve Finnan in the last minutes of the Champions League final, a 2–1 defeat to A.C. Milan.

Arbeloa's squad number changed from 2 to 17 for 2007–08, due to personal preference. He cemented a first-team place in that campaign, making 41 competitive appearances in a fourth-place finish.

On 17 May 2009, in a match against West Bromwich Albion, Arbeloa was involved in an on-field clash with teammate Jamie Carragher – the two had to be separated by Daniel Agger, Xabi Alonso, Emiliano Insúa and Pepe Reina. Carragher later explained that he clashed with Arbeloa as a moment of poor defending from the latter threatened the clean sheet, further explaining "we want to keep a clean sheet and we want Pepe to have a chance of the Golden Glove for the fourth season running"; Benítez refused to comment about the incident.

Return to Real Madrid

On 29 July 2009, it was announced that Real Madrid and Liverpool had reached an agreement on the transfer of Arbeloa, for a fee of £5 million and a five-year contract. After the departure of Míchel Salgado and Miguel Torres, he was handed the number 2 jersey. 

Arbeloa spent the vast majority of his first season in his second stint as a left-back, netting his first goal on 13 February 2010 in a 3–0 away win over Xerez CD. His second came in the Madrid Derby on 28 March, scoring with his right foot past David de Gea in the 3–2 defeat of Atlético Madrid. Under new manager José Mourinho, he celebrated his tenth appearance in the Champions League with his first goal in the competition, netting from outside the penalty area in a 4–0 victory at AFC Ajax in the group stage.

In the 2011–12 campaign, due to Ricardo Carvalho's lengthy injury, Sergio Ramos was relocated to centre-back and Arbeloa began appearing almost exclusively on the right side of the back four. On 1 August 2012, he extended his link to the club until June 2016.

Subsequently, Arbeloa became a fringe player. In 2015–16 he appeared in just nine matches in all competitions, two of those being in the Champions League which was won for the second time in three years; on 8 May 2016, he confirmed he would leave on 30 June.

West Ham United
On 31 August 2016, Arbeloa returned to the Premier League for the first time in seven years, signing for West Ham United for one season. He made his debut on 21 September, playing the full 90 minutes in a 1–0 home win against Accrington Stanley in the EFL Cup.

Arbeloa was released at the end of the campaign after having made just four competitive appearances, three in the league. He retired in June 2017 at the age of 34, after a professional career that spanned 15 years.

Coaching
Arbeloa returned to Real Madrid in September 2020, being appointed manager of the under-14 side. Two years later, he progressed to the Juvenil A.

International career

On 1 February 2008, Arbeloa was called up to the Spanish national team for the first time, for a friendly with France in Málaga, but he was forced to pull out because of injury. He made his debut on 26 March against Italy, and was picked for UEFA Euro 2008's final stages, appearing in the first-round match against Greece (2–1 win) as the nation emerged victorious.

Arbeloa's versatility saw him being called up for the 2009 FIFA Confederations Cup and the 2010 FIFA World Cup, again as Ramos backup. His contribution in the latter tournament, which also ended in victory, consisted of 14 minutes in the 2–0 victory over Honduras in the group phase.

Vicente del Bosque selected Arbeloa for the following tournament, Euro 2012. Due to Carles Puyol's absence, however, he was now part of the starting XI alongside Ramos, Gerard Piqué and Jordi Alba, with Spain only conceding once in six fixtures and winning the tournament.

Career statistics

Club

1 Includes League Cup and Supercopa de España.
2 Includes UEFA Champions League, UEFA Europa League, UEFA Super Cup and FIFA Club World Cup.

International

Honours
Liverpool
UEFA Champions League runner-up: 2006–07

Real Madrid
La Liga: 2011–12
Copa del Rey: 2010–11, 2013–14; runner-up: 2012–13
Supercopa de España: 2012; runner-up: 2011, 2014
UEFA Champions League: 2013–14, 2015–16
FIFA Club World Cup: 2014
UEFA Super Cup: 2014

Spain
FIFA World Cup: 2010
UEFA European Championship: 2008, 2012
FIFA Confederations Cup runner-up: 2013; third place: 2009

References

External links

Liverpool historic profile

1983 births
Living people
Sportspeople from Salamanca
Spanish footballers
Footballers from Castile and León
Footballers from Zaragoza
Association football defenders
La Liga players
Segunda División players
Segunda División B players
Tercera División players
Real Madrid C footballers
Real Madrid Castilla footballers
Real Madrid CF players
Deportivo de La Coruña players
Premier League players
Liverpool F.C. players
West Ham United F.C. players
UEFA Champions League winning players
Spain youth international footballers
Spain under-21 international footballers
Spain international footballers
UEFA Euro 2008 players
2009 FIFA Confederations Cup players
2010 FIFA World Cup players
UEFA Euro 2012 players
2013 FIFA Confederations Cup players
UEFA European Championship-winning players
FIFA World Cup-winning players
Spanish expatriate footballers
Expatriate footballers in England
Spanish expatriate sportspeople in England